Robert Haschka (born 6 February 1950) is a sailor from Austria. Denzel represented his country at the 1972 Summer Olympics in Kiel. Denzel took 17th place in the Soling with Uli Strohschneider as helmsman and Peter Denzel as fellow crew member.

References

Living people
1950 births
Austrian male sailors (sport)
Sailors at the 1972 Summer Olympics – Soling
Olympic sailors of Austria